Mueang Trang, also Mueang Thap Thiang, is the capital district (amphoe mueang) of Trang province, Thailand. The city (thesaban nakhon) has a population of 59,637 (2005) and covers tambon Thap Thiang of Mueang Trang District.

History
Mueang Trang or the previous name Thap Thiang, became the capital district of Trang province in 1915, when the capital was moved inland from Kantang, which was prone to flooding.

Geography
Neighboring districts are (from the south clockwise): Na Yong, Yan Ta Khao, Kantang, Sikao, Wang Wiset, Huai Yot of Trang Province; and Si Banphot of Phatthalung province.

Administration
The district is divided into 15 sub-districts (tambons), which are further subdivided into 118 villages (mubans). The city (thesaban nakhon) Trang covers tambon Thap Thiang. The township (thesaban tambon) Khlong Teng covers parts of tambon Na Tham Nuea. There are a further 14 tambon administrative organizations (TAO).

Missing numbers are tambons which now form Na Yong District.

Economy
Na Muen Si village in tambon Na Yong is the home of the Na Muen Si Woven Cloth Community Enterprise. The group of mostly elderly women has resurrected the village's ancient art of weaving. The collective weaves 39 patterns using 10 traditional looms along with ki kratuk shuttle looms. In 2014, the Na Muen Si Woven Cloth Museum opened with the financial support of local authorities and the Central Group. The museum exhibits about 100 traditional fabrics donated by the elders of the village and also newly woven cloth that exhibits its 32 original patterns.

Notable people
Chuan Leekpai – politician
Arkhom Chenglai – boxer who won 1992 Summer Olympics bronze medal

References

Districts of Trang province